Kathleen Ellis (born November 28, 1946) is an American former competition swimmer, two-time Olympic champion, and former world record-holder in three events.

Ellis represented the United States as a 17-year-old at the 1964 Summer Olympics in Tokyo, Japan.  She won two gold medals as a member of the winning U.S. teams in the women's 4×100-meter freestyle relay and women's 4×100-meter medley relay.  Individually, she also received two bronze medals for her third-place finishes in the women's 100-meter freestyle and women's 100-meter butterfly events.

Ellis was inducted into the International Swimming Hall of Fame as an "Honor Swimmer" in 1991.

See also
 List of members of the International Swimming Hall of Fame
 List of Olympic medalists in swimming (women)
 World record progression 100 metres butterfly
 World record progression 4 × 100 metres freestyle relay
 World record progression 4 × 100 metres medley relay

References

External links
 
 
 Image of U.S. Olympic swimmers Donna deVarona and Kathy Ellis, California, 1964. Los Angeles Times Photographic Archive (Collection 1429). UCLA Library Special Collections, Charles E. Young Research Library, University of California, Los Angeles.

1946 births
Living people
American female butterfly swimmers
American female freestyle swimmers
World record setters in swimming
Olympic gold medalists for the United States in swimming
Pan American Games gold medalists for the United States
Swimmers from Indianapolis
Swimmers at the 1963 Pan American Games
Swimmers at the 1964 Summer Olympics
Medalists at the 1964 Summer Olympics
Pan American Games bronze medalists for the United States
Olympic bronze medalists for the United States in swimming
Pan American Games medalists in swimming
Medalists at the 1963 Pan American Games
21st-century American women
20th-century American women